Stilbosis phaeoptera is a moth in the family Cosmopterigidae. It was described by William Trowbridge Merrifield Forbes in 1931. It is found in Puerto Rico.

References

Moths described in 1931
Chrysopeleiinae
Moths of the Caribbean